Russell Ingwald Tollefson (September 27, 1891 – May 13, 1962) was an American football coach in the National Football League for the Minneapolis Marines. He coached the team in 1922, posting a 5–3 overall record and a 1–3 NFL record.

References

 

1891 births
1962 deaths
Grinnell Pioneers football coaches
Minneapolis Marines coaches
Sports coaches from Minneapolis